The 2016 Armagh Senior Football Championship is the 116th official edition of the Armagh GAA's premier club Gaelic football tournament for senior club in County Armagh. The tournament consists of 16 teams with the winner going on to represent Armagh in the Ulster Senior Club Football Championship. The championship has a back-door format for the first two rounds before proceeding to a knock-out format. Generally, any team to lose two matches will be knocked out of the championship.

Crossmaglen Rangers are the defending champions after they defeated Armagh Harps 2-22 to 0-10 in the 2015 final, however they were knocked out at the semi-final stage this season by close rivals St. Patrick's Cullyhanna. This was only Crossmaglen's second loss in 20 years of Armagh Senior championship football.

This was Clann Éireann, Madden and Grange's return to the senior grade.

Forkhill and Grange were relegated to the I.F.C. for 2017 after finishing 7th and 8th respectively in this year's Senior 'B' Football League. They will be replaced next year by Whitecross and Culloville Blues after they claimed the 2016 I.F.C. and I.A.F.L. titles respectively.

On 16 October 2016, Maghery Sean MacDermott's claimed their first ever S.F.C. title when defeating St. Patrick's Cullyhanna in the Athletic Grounds on a score line of 1-13 to 0-13.

Promoted to SFC from IFC in 2015 

 Clann Éireann – (IFC & IFL Champions)
 Madden – (2nd in IFL)
 Grange – (3rd in IFL)

Relegated from SFC to IFC in 2015 
 Killeavy – (16th SFL)
 Carrickcruppen – (15th SFL)
 St. Paul's – (14th SFL)

Group stage

Round 1 
All 16 teams play in this round. The 8 winners progress to Round 2A while the 8 losers progress to Round 2B.

 Maghery 1-15 0-9 Annaghmore, Athletic Grounds, 19/8/2016
 Crossmaglen Rangers 2-13 1-10 Dromintee, Cullyhanna, 21/8/2016
 Clann Éireann 3-15 3-9 Madden, Pearse Óg Park, 21/8/2016
 Sarsfields 3-11 1-16 Forkhill, Ballymacnab, 21/8/2016
 Tír na nÓg 1-14 0-15 Granemore, Maghery, 21/8/2016
 Ballymacnab 1-15 0-16 Armagh Harps, Athletic Grounds, 26/8/2016
 Cullyhanna 2-20 1-5 Pearse Óg, Ballymavnab, 28/8/2016
 Wolfe Tones 3-15 2-16 Grange, Maghery, 28/8/2016

Round 2

Round 2A 
The 8 winners from Round 1 enter this round. The 4 winners enter the draw for the quarter finals while the 4 losers play in Round 3.

 Clann Éireann 4-11 0-13 Ballymacnab, Athletic Grounds, 9/9/2016
 Maghery 0-12 0-7 Wolfe Tones, Clann Éireann Park, 10/9/2016
 Crossmaglen Rangers 6-20 0-8 Tír na nÓg, Athletic Grounds, 11/9/2016
 Cullyhanna 1-15 1-9 Sarsfields, Athletic Grounds, 11/9/2016

Round 2B 
The 8 losers from Round 1 enter this round. The 4 winners advance to Round 3 while the 4 losers exit the Championship.

 Armagh Harps 2-16 0-9 Grange, Athletic Grounds, 9/9/2016
 Dromintee 0-15 0-11 Annaghmore, Abbey Park, 10/9/2016
 Pearse Óg 3-16 3-9 Madden, Ballymacnab, 10/9/2016
 Forkhill 4-8 0-9 Granemore, Silverbridge, 11/9/2016

Round 3 
The 4 losers from Round 2A play the 4 winners from Round 2B. The 4 winners enter the draw for the quarter-finals.

 Armagh Harps 3-17 3-14 Sarsfields, Athletic Grounds, 16/9/2016
 Ballymacnab 2-18 1-8 Pearse Óg, Athletic Grounds, 16/9/2016
 Dromintee 1-16 1-6 Tír na nÓg, Athletic Grounds, 19/9/2016
 Wolfe Tones 1-9 0-7 Forkhill, Athletic Grounds, 19/9/2016

Knock-Out Stage

Last Eight Draw

Quarter-finals 
The four winners from Round 2A play the four winners from Round 3. The 4 winners advance to the semi-finals.

 Clann Éireann 0-11, 0-10 Ballymacnab, Ballycrummy Road, 24/9/2016
 Crossmaglen Rangers 1-16, 1-13 Armagh Harps, Keady, 25/9/2016
 Maghery 1-15, 2-5 Dromintee, Athletic Grounds, 25/9/2016
 Cullyhanna 1-13, 1-7 Wolfe Tones, Ballymacnab, 25/9/2016

Semi-finals 
 Maghery 2-17, 1-9 Clann Éireann, Athletic Grounds, 30/9/2016   Report
  Cullyhanna 1-15, 0-17 Crossmaglen Rangers, Athletic Grounds, 2/10/2016   Report

Final

Ulster Senior Club Football Championship

References 

Armagh Senior Football Championship
Armagh Senior Football Championship